Peter Rowe (born 1947) is a Canadian filmmaker and author specializing in themes of history and exploration. He is the producer of the 49-part television series Angry Planet, which airs on streaming and television networks around the world. His book, Music vs The Man was published in 2020.

Career

Rowe’s feature films include Treasure Island starring Jack Palance and Kevin Zegers, Lost! starring Ken Welsh, Michael Hogan and Helen Shaver, and The Best Bad Thing starring George Takei

Rowe has directed numerous documentaries including Beyond the Red Wall, Art War, Joshua Slocum: New World Columbus, and Popcorn With Maple Syrup: Film in Canada from Eh to Zed.

His 2013 film Shipwrecked on a Great Lake is based on James Fenimore Cooper's book 

Television series he has directed include Angry Planet, On the Run, Super Humans, Ready or Not, E.N.G., African Skies, Exploring Under Sail, and Fast Track.

His wilderness filmmaking has taken place in over 40 countries and many far-flung corners of the world including numerous active volcanoes, several hurricanes and tornadoes, Antarctica, Cape Horn, the Canadian Arctic, and the Sahara and Arabian Deserts.

Rowe has also performed as an actor, most recently playing Hunter S. Thompson in the TV biography series Final 24.

He appeared in the documentary film Rewind This about the impact of VHS on the film industry and home video.

His 2020 book, Music vs The Man chronicles the battles between musicians and the authorities—police, border guards, mayors, city councils, the FBI, the Kremlin.

His 2021 book, Ablaze: 10 Years that Shook the World, recounts the revolutionary, incendiary era of the late 60s and early 70s, including the birth of the new passions of the era—Black power, the environmental movement, women's liberation, gay pride, the animal rights movement, sexual revolution, and the antiwar movement.

Awards

 Canadian Society of Cinematographers 2010 Award for Lifestyle/Reality Cinematography (Angry Planet "Hurricane Triple Threat")
 Gold Medal, Worldfest Film Festival (Treasure Island)
 Gold Special Jury Award, Houston Film Festival (Joshua Slocum: New World Columbus)
 Best Film, Montreal Children’s Film Festival (The Best Bad Thing)

Memberships
Explorers Club (Fellow, Past Chair-Canadian Chapter (Ontario/Nunavut)
Directors Guild of Canada (Ontario Chairman, 2001–2003)
Canadian Society of Cinematographers
Writers Guild of Canada
Royal Canadian Geographic Society (Fellow)
Founding Board Member-Whistler Film Festival
Founding Board Member-Explorers Club Film Festival
Lecturer in Post-Graduate Film Production-Sheridan College (2002–2003)
Lecturer in Film Production – Harris Institute for the Arts (1995–1997)

Further reading
Rowe chronicled his life and adventures in his 2013 memoir Adventures in Filmmaking.

References

External links

1947 births
Living people
Canadian television directors
Film directors from Winnipeg
Canadian documentary film directors